The Ruschmeyer R 90 is a four-seat light aircraft designed and produced in Germany in the late 1980s and early 1990s.

Design and development

MF-85
Ruschmeyer Luftfahrttechnik initially designed the Ruschmeyer MF-85, intended to be powered by Porsche PFM 3200 derivatives, which was debuted at the 1987 Hannover Air Show. The MF-85 was a composite four seat aircraft, planned to be offered with  engines, priced at DM245,000 to DM325,000 (excluding avionics), with optional fixed or retractable undercarriage.
The prototype (V001 D-EEHE) first flew with a  Porsche PFM 3200N, driving a 3-bladed Mühlbauer MTV.9 constant speed propeller, on 8 August 1988, piloted by Horst Ruschmeyer. The second and third aircraft, V002 (D-EERO) and V003 (D-EERH), on flew on 23 September 1990 and 12 February 1992 respectively. Despite promising flight test results, the unavailability of Porsche engines led to the development of the Textron Lycoming powered R 90.

R 90
Powered by a Lycoming IO-540-C4D5 driving a Mühlbauer MTV.14-B constant speed propeller, the production R 90-230RG was built from 1988 to the mid-1990s in Germany.

German certification was awarded in June 1992, with 28 production aircraft built when Ruschmeyer Luftfahrttechnik filed for bankruptcy in June 1996. In 1999, the assets of Ruschmeyer were purchased by Solaris Aviation of West Palm Beach, Florida, marketing the R90 as the Solaris Sigma. In 2004, the project passed to Aircraft Technology Consulting, which restarted production in Germany, building two more aircraft by mid 2005.

Variants
Data from:
MF-85 The first three prototypes powered by Porsche PFM 3200 engines.
R 90 Production aircraft powered by Lycoming IO-540-C4D5 engines
R 90-230-RG: The main variant with retractable undercarriage
R 90-230-FG: Variant with fixed undercarriage, powered by Lycoming O-540-J engines.
R 90-180-FG: Variant with fixed undercarriage, powered by Lycoming IO-360 engines.
R 90-350T-RG: High performance variant with retractable undercarriage, powered by  turbo-charged engines.
R 90-420AT-RG:High performance variant with retractable undercarriage, powered by Allison 250-B17 turboprop engines
R 95 5/6 seat variant with retractable undercarriage.
Solaris Sigma Production and marketing in the United States

Specifications (R 90-230 RG)

References

External links

Airliners.net
The Ruschmeyer aircraft
Solaris Aviation website

1980s German civil utility aircraft
1990s German civil utility aircraft
Low-wing aircraft
Single-engined tractor aircraft
Aircraft first flown in 1988